The handball competition of the 2017 Central American Games in Managua was held from December 4 to 8 at the Instituto nicaraguense de deportes, in both the men's and women's tournament, three teams qualified for the 2018 Central American and Caribbean Games.

Participating teams

Men

Women

Medal summary

Men's tournament

Round Robin
All times are local (UTC−06:00).

Final standing

Women's tournament

Qualification round

All times are local (UTC−06:00).

Knockout stage

Bracket

Semifinals

Bronze medal game

Gold medal game

Final standing

References

External links
website of the 2017 Central American Games 
Championship page on PATHF Official Website

Central American Games
2017 Central American Games